Rock, Paper, Scissors (also known as Rock Paper Dead) is a 2017 American psychological thriller film directed by Tom Holland and written by Kerry Fleming and Victor Miller.

Synopsis
Serial killer Peter "the Doll Maker" Harris is considered cured and is released from a state hospital for the criminally insane. He returns to his ancestral family home, where he is haunted by childhood memories and ghostly visitations from his past victims. Ashley, a beautiful writer who wants to write a book about him, enters his life, rekindling old desires.

Cast
 Luke Macfarlane as Peter Harris
 Jennifer Titus as Ashley Grant
 Michael Madsen as Doyle Dechert
 Tatum O'Neal as Dr. Evelyn Bauer
 Anna Margaret as Zoe Palmer
 John Dugan as Uncle Charles
 Gabrielle Stone as Barbara
 Courtlyn Cannan as Angela Grant
 Nicole Pierce as Detective Walker
 Kerry Fleming as Detective Flynn
 Quinton Aaron as Joe
 Ari Lehman as Jason
 Sam Puefua as Michael
 Maureen McCormick as Nurse Ruland
 Shanda Renee as Nurse Collins
 Najarra Townsend as Harmony
 Max Madsen as Kris

Promotion and release
In 2016 it was announced that Holland would be directing the film Rock Paper Dead, to be written by Friday the 13th screenwriter Victor Miller. A trailer for the film was released on March 2, 2017. On October 21, 2017, the film premiered at Nightmares Film Festival in Columbus, Ohio, where it won Best Screenplay Feature. The film was set for wide release in 2018, but this date was postponed. In May 2019 it was announced that the film would be released under the title Rock, Paper, Scissors on DVD/Blu-ray as well as on VOD on July 23, 2019.

References

External links
 

2017 films
2010s psychological horror films
2010s serial killer films
American psychological horror films
2010s English-language films
American serial killer films
2017 horror films
Films directed by Tom Holland
Films about child sexual abuse
Films with screenplays by Victor Miller (writer)
2010s American films